Oocystis is a planktonic genus of mostly freshwater green algae of the family Oocystaceae. The type species is Oocystis naegelii A.Braun.

References

External links

Oocystaceae
Trebouxiophyceae genera
Trebouxiophyceae